Colin "Popeye" Doyle (born September 8, 1977) is a Canadian former professional lacrosse player and captain for the Toronto Rock of the National Lacrosse League and the Six Nations Chiefs of Major Series Lacrosse.

National Lacrosse League (NLL) career
Doyle was born in Kitchener, Ontario. He began his NLL career in 1998, playing for Ontario Raiders. He scored 34 goals and 27 assists, leading the Raiders in scoring. He was named NLL Rookie of the Year.

In 1999, the Raiders moved to Toronto, becoming the Toronto Rock, where they won their first of 6 NLL Championships. Doyle finished first or second in Rock scoring every year from 1999 until 2005, and was named league MVP in 2005. He has been named playoff MVP an unprecedented three times — in 1999, 2002, and 2005.

On December 27, 2006, the Rock traded Doyle, Darren Halls, and a draft pick to the San Jose Stealth for Ryan Benesch, Kevin Fines, Chad Thompson, and two draft picks.

Just after the 2009 season began, Doyle was named by Paul Tutka of NLLInsider.com as the top player in the league, stating that Doyle "has become today's most stellar offensive leader, creating a relationship with Jeff Zywicki that is turning out to be one of the most lethal in the NLL." Tutka also praised Doyle's commitment to his teammates: 

Doyle was named a starter to the All-Star Game in both 2009 and 2012.

On December 14, 2009, almost three years after they traded him away, the Rock re-acquired Doyle from the Stealth for Lewis Ratcliff, Tyler Codron, and Joel Dalgarno.

On November 9, 2016, Doyle announced his retirement from lacrosse.

Major League Lacrosse (MLL) career
2008 - Member of Rochester Rattlers, MLL Champions
2009 - Member of Toronto Nationals (now Hamilton Nationals), MLL Champions

Mann Cup career
The Mann Cup is the trophy awarded to the senior men's lacrosse champions of Canada. The championship series is played between the British Columbia Western Lacrosse Association (WLA) champion and the Ontario Major Series Lacrosse (MSL) champion.

Doyle has been a Mann Cup winner with both a WLA team and an MSL team.

2001 - Member of Coquitlam Adanacs, winners of the Mann Cup, WLA champions
2003 - Member of Brampton Excelsiors (MSL), finalists in the Mann Cup, MSL champions
2007 - Member of Coquitlam Adanacs, finalists in the Mann Cup, WLA champions
2008 - Member of Brampton Excelsiors (MSL), winners of the Mann Cup, MSL champions
2009 - Member of Brampton Excelsiors (MSL), winners of the Mann Cup, MSL champions
2013 - Member of Six Nations Chiefs, winners of the Mann Cup, MSL champions
2014 - Member of Six Nations Chiefs, winners of the Mann Cup, MSL champions

Bible of Lacrosse Mann Cup Stats
MSL Statistics 2010-2014 - Colin Doyle
MSL Statistics 2009 - Colin Doyle
WLA Statistics 2007 - Colin Doyle
WLA Statistics 2005 - Colin Doyle

International lacrosse career
2002 - Member of Team Canada, finalists in the Heritage Cup and World Lacrosse Championship
2003 - Member of Team Canada, winners of the World Indoor Lacrosse Championships in Hamilton, Ontario
2004 - Member of Team Canada, winners of the Heritage Cup
2006 - Member of Team Canada, winners of the World Lacrosse Championship in London, Ontario

Statistics

NLL
Reference:

References

Awards

1977 births
Canadian expatriate lacrosse people in the United States
Canadian lacrosse players
Canadian people of Irish descent
Lacrosse forwards
Lacrosse people from Ontario
Living people
National Lacrosse League All-Stars
National Lacrosse League major award winners
San Jose Stealth players
Sportspeople from Kitchener, Ontario
Hamilton Nationals players
Toronto Rock players